Phyllachora graminis is a plant pathogen infecting wheat.

References

External links 
 Index Fungorum
 USDA ARS Fungal Database

Fungal plant pathogens and diseases
Wheat diseases
Phyllachorales
Taxa named by Christiaan Hendrik Persoon